Ruby Blue was a Scottish folk pop band formed by singer Rebecca Pidgeon and guitarist Roger Fife in the 1980s.

Pidgeon was a student at the Royal Academy of Dramatic Arts. In 1986, her friend Roger Fife, a guitarist, asked her to sing on a demo tape which was then sent to Red Flame Records in London. After hearing the demo, the label signed Pidgeon and Fife and released their first album, Glances Askances.

Pidgeon became the lead singer of Ruby Blue, which included Anthony Coote on bass guitar, Erika Spotswood on backing vocals, and Chris Buck on drums. Buck was later replaced on drums by Karlos Edwards. Coote and Pidgeon left in 1990. Pidgeon went to the U.S. and pursued an acting career. Erika Spotswood (now Woods) took her place on lead vocals.

Woods and Fife kept the band's name, releasing the album Almost Naked in 1993. The album was unsuccessful, and Ruby Blue disbanded. Woods moved to Los Angeles and married Tony Philips, the producer of Ruby Blue's Down from Above album. Fife  became a producer and worked with Cyndi Lauper, Antony and the Johnsons, and Tricky.

Discography
 Glances Askances (Red Flame, 1987)
 Down from Above (Fontana, 1990)
 Broken Water (Red Flame 1992)
 Paradise (Red Flame 1993)
 Almost Naked (Aris, 1993)
 Remasters (Universal 2011)

References

Scottish folk music groups
British folk rock groups